"A Tender Lie" is a song written by Randy Sharp, and recorded by American country music band Restless Heart. It was released in September 1988 as the second single from the album Big Dreams in a Small Town. The song was the group's sixth consecutive number one, their sixth overall, and ultimately their final number one on the country chart.  The single went to number one for one week.

Music video
The music video was directed by George Bloom III and premiered in late 1988.

Chart performance

Year-End Charts

Covers
R&B group The Three Degrees recorded a cover of the song for their 1989 album Three Degrees...And Holding and Dolly Parton recorded a bluegrass cover on her 2001 album Little Sparrow.

References

1988 singles
Restless Heart songs
Songs written by Randy Sharp
Song recordings produced by Scott Hendricks
RCA Records Nashville singles
1988 songs